The 1986 Chattanooga Moccasins football team represented the University of Tennessee at Chattanooga as a member of the Southern Conference (SoCon) in the 1986 NCAA Division I-AA football season. The Moccasins  were led by third-year head coach Buddy Nix and played their home games at Chamberlain Field. They finished the season 4–7 overall 2–4 in SoCon play to place in sixth.

Schedule

References

Chattanooga
Chattanooga Mocs football seasons
Chattanooga Moccasins football